Denier may refer to:

 the French form of denarius (penny)
 French denier (penny), a type of medieval coin
 Denier (unit), a unit of linear mass density of fibers 
 Denier, also Denyer, a French and English surname (probably a metonymic occupational name for a provider of commodities or a moneyer / minter), hence also a (rare) given name
 Jacques Denier (1894-1983), French painter
 Lydie Denier, French actress
 C. Denier Warren, American TV and film actor
the agent noun of "deny", see Denial (disambiguation)
 Denialism
 The Deniers, a 2008 book by Canadian environmentalist Lawrence Solomon
 Denier, Pas-de-Calais, France

See also

 
 not to be confused with Diener, German term for "servant; assistant"
 Denyer
 Deny (disambiguation)
 Denial (disambiguation)
 Refusal (disambiguation)